Dictionnaires Le Robert is a French publisher of dictionaries founded by Paul Robert. Its Petit Robert is often considered the authoritative single-volume dictionary of the French language.

The founding members of the editorial board were the lexicographers, Alain Rey and Josette Rey-Debove.

Bilingual dictionaries
Dictionnaires Le Robert  also publishes a series of bilingual dictionaries, including English–French and German–French dictionaries, in collaboration with HarperCollins, Italian–French dictionaries, in collaboration with Zanichelli, and Dutch–French dictionaries, in collaboration with Van Dale.

External links
 Official site 
 Free version of the dictionary 

Book publishing companies of France
Editis